This is a list of people who have served as mayor of the city of Hampton, Virginia.

See also
 Timeline of Hampton, Virginia

Notes

References 
"Mayors of Hampton, Virginia" provided by Hampton Clerk of City Council, 2005
"Council Names New Mayor" provided by City of Hampton official website
"Molly Ward appointed to White House post, will resign as mayor" provided by City of Hampton official website

Hampton, Virginia